O Pyeong-gil (born 15 April 1944) is a South Korean volleyball player. He competed in the men's tournament at the 1964 Summer Olympics.

References

1944 births
Living people
South Korean men's volleyball players
Olympic volleyball players of South Korea
Volleyball players at the 1964 Summer Olympics
Place of birth missing (living people)
20th-century South Korean people